is a horizontally scrolling shooter for the Family Computer that was released exclusively for the Japanese market on March 19, 1986.

Plot
Taking a cue from the popular Star Wars series opening crawl (with its catch phase A long time ago, in a galaxy far, far away...), the title screen contains the nearly identical catch phrase of A long long time ago. In the year 2999, people from the planet Star Lenion (which is very similar to planet Earth) are under attack from the Bismark Empire.

Gameplay

The game is side-scrolling shooter where players must defeat enemy aircraft and depart from their launch pad.

Items
Blue capsule
Energy is restored up to the maximum.
Yellow capsule
The player's machine would be invincible for a certain period of time. However, hitting the terrain would still destroy the player.
Koala
Grants the player an extra life.

References

1986 video games
Cyberpunk video games
Horizontally scrolling shooters
Japan-exclusive video games
Nintendo Entertainment System games
Nintendo Entertainment System-only games
Shouei games
Video games developed in Japan
Multiplayer and single-player video games